Trichoptilus pelias is a moth of the family Pterophoridae that is found in India.

References

Moths described in 1908
Oxyptilini
Endemic fauna of India
Moths of Asia